Michael Thomas Joseph Keane (born 29 December 1982) is an Irish former professional footballer who played on the left side of midfield. He played as a professional from 2000 until 2008, turning out for Preston North End, Grimsby Town, Hull City and Rotherham United before ending his career when he was released by League of Ireland Premier Division team St Patrick's Athletic in 2008.

Playing career

Preston North End
Keane was born  in Dublin. He started his career in 2000 at Preston North End, he was part of a decent youth team under David Moyes that helped strengthen the club's position in the First Division. Keane came to prominence in the 2001–02 season where he played alongside Jon Macken. After twice breaking his foot, and only making one start during the 2002–03 season, he was made available for loan and joined fellow First Division side Grimsby Town on the transfer deadline day in March 2003. He joined The Mariners with the hope of saving them from relegation. Despite playing well, and scoring two goals, Grimsby were relegated. Despite interest from Grimsby in signing Keane on a permanent basis, he returned to Deepdale following the end of the season and returned to first team action for Preston.

Hull City
After four years and over 50 games at Preston, Keane signed for Hull City for £500,000 in June 2004, saying "It's dropping down a division, but I look at it as a stepping stone. I think this is a club that's definitely on the up", and was part of an impressive squad that was put together at the Yorkshire club. However, he started only twelve games during the 2004–05 season and with no future at the club, he was loaned out to Rotherham United for one month in March 2005.

Rotherham United
After impressing during his loan spell at Millmoor, Keane signed for the club permanently on a two-year contract. He featured extensively for Rotherham during the 2005–06 season until an operation on a hernia condition in November 2005 ruled him out for several weeks. Later in the season, after returning from the operation, he was sent off against Tranmere in April 2006, leading to a five-match ban that ruled him out for the rest of the season. He was later charged with persistent misconduct by the Football Association having been sent off three times during the season. He was released at the end of the 2006–07 season following the relegation of Rotherham from League One.

St Patricks Athletic
Following his release he signed with St Patricks Athletic where he remained for one season and played in the UEFA Cup. In the 2008 season he made only two substitute league appearances and in July 2008, he was unlawfully sacked and discriminated against by the club who called him overweight. The following month it was ruled the club were wrong to sack him. In December 2008, Dundalk offered him a contract, but Keane opted to do his uefa coaching badges where he received UEFA A and B Badges.

Coaching career

Keane moved into coaching for O'Deveney Dunard in the Athletic Union League  before replacing Anto Brennan as manager when Brennan moved on. He later took over at Stella Maris Under 15s before leaving a few months later.

Keane then had a stint with Brendanville, followed by his appointment at Dingle United FC as their AUL Premier B manager. He left in April 2015. In May 2015 he took over at Hardwicke FC as 1st Team Manager. 
He led them to promotion to the top flight of amateur football for the first time in the club's history. Keane decided to part ways the following season leaving his assistant in charge. It was believed to be for personal reasons.

References

External links

Ireland stats at 11v11

1982 births
Republic of Ireland association footballers
Living people
Rotherham United F.C. players
Grimsby Town F.C. players
Preston North End F.C. players
Hull City A.F.C. players
St Patrick's Athletic F.C. players
League of Ireland players
English Football League players
Association football midfielders